Stefania is a genus of frogs in the family Hemiphractidae. They are native to the highlands of the Guiana Shield in southern Venezuela, Guyana, and adjacent far northern Brazil. Most are restricted to the tepui highlands, but S. evansi also occurs in lowlands. On most mountains there are only 1–2 species from this genus, but five are known from Mount Ayanganna and the neighbouring Mount Wokomung has six species. They are usually found near streams at low levels on branches/leaves or on the ground among vegetation/rocks.

They are famous for their breeding strategy where the development from eggs to froglets is completed on the back of the female (the eggs hatch to froglets; there is no free-swimming tadpole stage). The common name carrying frog is sometimes used for Stefania species and it refers to this behavior. A comparable behavior can also be seen in the other genera in the family Hemiphractidae.

Species
There are 19 Stefania species:

References

 
Hemiphractidae
Amphibians of South America
Amphibian genera
Taxa named by Juan A. Rivero
Amphibians of the Tepuis